This is a list of localities in Djibouti ordered by population according to the 2009 census.  All settlements with a population over 10,000 are included.

List

Other cities
As Ela (ايلى)
Assa Hougoud (أسا هوغود‎)
Assamo (أسامو)
Balho (بالهو)
Chebelle (شبيلي)
Daimoli (دايمولي)
Daoudaouya (داوديا)
Dorale (دورال)
Doumera (دوميرا)
Godoria (غودوريا)
Khor Angar (خور أنغار)
Randa (راندا)
Ras Siyyan (رأس سيان)
Sagallou (ساجالو)
Yoboki (يوبوكي)

Towns and villages
 

Boul'aos

See also
List of cities in East Africa
List of metropolitan areas in Africa
List of largest cities in the Arab world

References

External links

 
Djibouti, List of cities in
Djibouti
Cities

simple:Djibouti#Cities